is a railway station in the town of Tateyama, Toyama, Japan, operated by the private railway operator Toyama Chihō Railway.

Lines

Station layout 
The station has one ground-level side platform serving a single bi-directional track. The station is unattended.

History
Kamagafuchi Station was opened on 19 March 1921.

Adjacent stations

Passenger statistics
In fiscal 2015, the station was used by 263 passengers daily.

Surrounding area 
Kamagafuchi Elementary School
Kamagafuchi Post Office

See also
 List of railway stations in Japan

References

External links

  

Railway stations in Toyama Prefecture
Railway stations in Japan opened in 1921
Stations of Toyama Chihō Railway
Tateyama, Toyama